Edmonton has a humid continental climate (Köppen climate classification Dfb). It falls into the NRC 4a Plant Hardiness Zone.

The city is known for having cold winters. Temperatures can exceed  for an average of four to five days anytime from late April to mid-September and fall below  for an average of 24.6 days. This surpasses the previous  set on June 29th 1937.

Summer lasts from late June until early September, and the humidity is seldom uncomfortably high. Winter lasts from November to March and in common with all of Alberta varies greatly in length and severity. Spring and autumn are both short and highly variable. Edmonton's growing season is from May 9 to September 22; Edmonton averages 135–140 frost-free days a year. At the summer solstice, Edmonton receives 17 hours and three minutes of daylight, with an hour and 46 minutes of civil twilight. On average Edmonton receives 2,299 hours of bright sunshine per year and is one of Canada's sunniest cities.

The summer of 2006 was a particularly warm one for Edmonton, as temperatures reached  or higher more than 20 times from mid-May to early September. The winter of 2011–12 was particularly warm; from December 22, 2011, till March 20, 2012, on 53 occasions Edmonton saw temperatures at or above  at the City Centre Airport.

The winter of 1969 was particularly cold. The city’s Newspaper, The Journal, issued certificates for residents who lived through ‘Edmonton’s record cold spell’. 

Edmonton has a fairly dry climate. Precipitation is heaviest in the late spring, summer, and early autumn. The wettest month is July, while the driest months are February, March, October, and November. Dry spells are not uncommon and may occur at any time of the year. Summer thunderstorms can be frequent and occasionally severe enough to produce large hail, damaging winds, funnel clouds, and occasionally tornadoes. Twelve tornadoes had been recorded in Edmonton between 1890 and 1989, and eight since 1990. A F4 tornado that struck Edmonton on July 31, 1987, killing 27, was unusual in many respects, including severity, duration, damage, and casualties. It is commonly referred to as Black Friday due both to its aberrant characteristics and the emotional shock it generated. Then-mayor Laurence Decore cited the community's response to the tornado as evidence that Edmonton was a "city of champions," which later became an unofficial slogan of the city.

This "1-in-200 year event" flooded major intersections and underpasses and damaged both residential and commercial properties. The storm caused extensive damage to West Edmonton Mall; a small glass section of the roof collapsed under the weight of the rainwater, causing water to drain onto the mall's indoor ice rink. As a result, the mall was evacuated as a precautionary measure.

Classification

Data

Recent data

1981-2010

Old data

1971-2000

1961-1990

Climate change 
By 2018, 73% of the city's residents were concerned about climate change. In the same year the city hosted the Intergovernmental Panel on Climate Change's (IPCC): Cities and Climate Change Science Conference. Edmonton has been working on the energy efficiency plan for both civilian and business people. David Dodge, co-chair of its energy transition advisory committee, said Edmonton currently emits 20 tonnes of carbon per person. There was also the financing of solar panels. US $ 3.2 billion would be the impact of climate change in Edmonton by 2050, at which point the city will experience approximately sixteen days per year with temperatures exceeding 30°C and an average high of around 35°C, resulting in more heat waves. The annual average temperature of 2.1°C would rise to 5.6°C or up to 8°C by 2080, with no correction according to the Climate Resilient report Edmonton: Adaptation Strategy and Action Plan. Storms, gusts of wind and freezing rain would be more frequent and cause more damage.

Notes

References

Climate by city in Canada
Edmonton